Saint-Jacques-de-la-Lande (Gallo: Saent-Jaq) is a commune of Rennes Métropole in the Ille-et-Vilaine department of Brittany in northwestern France.

Population

People from Saint-Jacques-de-la-Lande are called jacquolandins in French (also spelled jacolandins).

See also
 Rennes - Saint-Jacques Airport
Communes of the Ille-et-Vilaine department

References

External links

Official website 
Mayors of Ille-et-Vilaine Association 

Communes of Ille-et-Vilaine